Balderton Capital is a venture capital firm based in London, UK, that invests in early-stage, technology and internet startup companies in Europe. It is considered to be among the four-biggest venture capital firms in the English capital. 

Founded in 2000 as Benchmark Capital Europe, Balderton Capital became fully independent in 2007. The company made over 100 early-stage investments between 2000 and 2020, including Revolut, Betfair, The Hut Group, MySQL, Yoox, Depop, Talend, Recorded Future, NaturalMotion, Kobalt Music Group, GoCardless, CityMapper, and Sophia Genetics.

In November 2019, Balderton announced Balderton VII, a new $400m fund to invest in European companies at Series A. The new fund will reportedly make approximately 12 investments annually. In 2018, Balderton announced the first fund dedicated to buying equity from existing shareholders of European technology startups. In 2021, Balderton announced the first fund dedicated to growth, with $680M under management and a further $600M for early stage investing, bringing its total assets to over $5B.

Partners
The partners of the firm are Bernard Liautaud, Tim Bunting, Suranga Chandratillake, Rob Moffat, Daniel Waterhouse, James Wise, David Thevenon, and Rana Yared.

Investments
Notable investments have included:

3D Hubs
Aircall
Appear Here
Bebo (sold to AOL for $850M)
Betfair (Went public and now merged as Paddy Power Betfair)
Big Fish Games (sold to Churchill Downs for $885m)  
Carwow
Circle (healthcare partnership)
Citymapper
Funnel
Globoforce

Kobalt Music Group
Lovefilm
MySQL (sold to Sun Microsystems for $1B)
NaturalMotion (sold to Zynga)
Prodigy Finance
Rebtel
Revolut
McMakler
Setanta Sports (liquidated)

Sophia Genetics
Sunrise Calendar
Talend (public on NASDAQ)
The Hut Group
Tictail
Vivino
Wooga
Yoox

Exits

Since 2008, Balderton has had many prominent exits, including Betfair ($2bn IPO of which they owned 3.95%), Bebo ($850m sale to AOL), Depop ( sale to Etsy for $1.65B ), Scansafe (sale to Cisco, 30% stake), Lovefilm (sale to Amazon.com, 5% stake), Yoox ($700m IPO), MySQL ($1bn sale to Sun Microsystems, 15% stake), Big Fish Games (sold to Churchill Downs for $885m), Recorded Future ($780m sale to Insight Partners, Sunrise (sold to Microsoft), Talend (2016, Nasdaq IPO at $1.5B), Sophia Genetics ( 2021, Nasdaq IPO at $1.2B), Darktrace (2021, FTSE IPO at $3.5B ), Frontier Car Group (majority bought by OLX in 2019 for $700M), and Magic Pony Technologies (sold to Twitter).

References

External links

Venture capital firms of the United Kingdom
Financial services companies based in London
Companies based in San Francisco
Financial services companies established in 2000
2000 establishments in England